Nizhnyaya Katukhovka is a rural locality (a selo) and the administrative center of Nizhnekatukhovskoye Rural Settlement, Novousmansky District, Voronezh Oblast, Russia. The population was 604 as of 2010. There are 4 streets.

Geography 
Nizhnyaya Katukhovka is located 35 km east of Novaya Usman (the district's administrative centre) by road. Trudolyubovka is the nearest rural locality.

References 

Rural localities in Novousmansky District